CAT I may refer to:
 Instrument landing system#ILS categories
 Chloramphenicol O-acetyltransferase I, an enzyme
 Carnitine O-palmitoyltransferase I, another enzyme
 Measurement category CAT I, a class of live electrical circuits used in measurement and testing